Birhanu Bogale (born 27 February 1986) is an Ethiopian footballer. He currently plays for Dedebit FC and is a member of the Ethiopian national football team.

Career

Birhanu is left winger, and since 2010 plays for Dedebit FC.

International career

He has been part of the Ethiopia national football team since 2007. He is on the list for 2013 African Nations Cup.

References

External links
 
 

1986 births
Living people
Ethiopia international footballers
2013 Africa Cup of Nations players
Ethiopian footballers
2014 African Nations Championship players
Ethiopia A' international footballers
Association football wingers